Sri Lanka Railways Class S13 is a Diesel-Electric Multiple Unit (DEMU) trainset, built for Sri Lanka Railways by Integral Coach Factory, Chennai and imported through RITES, an Indian Railways PSU on a line of credit extended by the Indian Government in 2011. Sri Lanka Railways Ordered for 6 modern state of the art DEMU trainsets in 2017. Class S13 possess AC First, Second and Third Class accommodations. The first trainset of the order arrived Sri Lanka in December 2018.

Later in 2019, Sri Lanka Railways ordered another 2 Fully Air-conditioned DEMU trainsets, named as Class S13A. Unlike S13, S13A has a Restaurant Car. The first trainset of Class S13A arrived Sri Lanka in November 2021.

Details
SALIENT FEATURES:

•13 car DEMU rake formation with maximum operational speed of 120 kmph.

•1800hp onboard engine on DPC and AC-AC 3-Phase electric transmission system

•Stainless steel aerodynamic front end for DPC and DTC.

•AC chair car provided with 180° Rotatable seats which consists of mobile charging sockets and audio visual system for infotainment.

•Fully sealed gangways integrated with Anti-skid Stainless Steel foot plate.

•Stainless steel shell body With corten steel underframe similar to LHB coach.

•PU corrosion resistant painting with anti-graffiti coating.

•Superior insulation and damping elements used for better acoustic and elimination of vibrations. 

•GPS based passenger information and public address system provided in all coaches. LCD display indicates speed, location and announcement.

•Fire detection, alarm and suppression system.

•FRP modular toilets, with pressurised flushing system in all coaches.

•Sleek energy efficient RMPU for AC coaches.

Arrangement
Total number of seats inside different classes are as follows:

DPC is a single-ended locomotive without passenger seating area.
RAKE FORMATION

For S13:

DPC ‐ 5 TC - 2 DTC - 4 TC - DPC (For 13 car formation)

DPC - 4 TC - DTC (For 6 car formation)

DPC - 5 TC - DTC (For 7 car formation)

DPC - 6 TC - DTC (For 8 car formation) 

》Here TC is an abbreviation for Trailer Coach, which could be of any class of accommodation (AC First Class, Second Class OR Third Class). Coach composition keeps changing according to the demand.

For S13A:

DPC - 5 AFC - RCV - 5 AFC - DPC (13 car formation)

Abbreviations Used:

•DPC = Driving Power Car

•DTC = Driving Trailer Car

•TC = Trailer Car

•AFC = Air-conditioned First Class

•RCV = Restaurant cum Guard Coach

Current Operations

Northern line

Uttara Devi-:Colombo Fort-Anuradapura-Jaffna-Kankesanturai

Sri Devi-:Colombo Fort-Anuradhapura-Jaffna-Kankesanthurai

KKS Intercity-:Colombo Fort-Anuradhapura-Jaffna-Kankesanthurai

KKS Night Intercity (Weekend only)-:Colombo Fort-Anuradhapura-Jaffna-Kankesanthurai

Batticaloa Line

Pulathisi Intercity Express:-Colombo Fort-Polonnaruwa

Coastal LineGalu Kumari-:Maradana-Galle-Matara-BeliattaDakshina Intercity Express''-:Maradana-Galle-Matara-Beliatta

Reservations
Passengers are allowed to book their tickets within a month before the journey to travel in 1st class and 2nd class coaches in Uttara Devi train. In galu kumari train reservations are allowed only in 1st class coaches

References

Multiple units of Sri Lanka
Diesel multiple units with locomotive-like power cars